Billy Ashcroft (born 1 October 1952) is an English retired footballer who played both as a central defender and as a forward. He made his League debut for Middlesbrough on 3 September 1977 in a 2–1 defeat at West Bromwich Albion, after having previously served Wrexham for seven years, playing 219 matches and scoring 72 goals. Ashcroft was transferred to FC Twente in the Netherlands in 1982, where he stayed for three years, making 77 league appearances and scoring 29 goals. He was the club top-scorer in the 1983–84 season. In 1985, he moved to Tranmere Rovers, where he scored twice in 23 league appearances.

References
 Billy Ashcroft career stats at Sporting-Heroes.net

1952 births
Living people
English footballers
English expatriate footballers
Association football central defenders
Association football forwards
Middlesbrough F.C. players
FC Twente players
Tranmere Rovers F.C. players
Wrexham A.F.C. players
Footballers from Liverpool
English Football League players
Eredivisie players
Expatriate footballers in the Netherlands